The National Latino Congreso is a political organization in the United States of Latino Americans for the purpose of mobilizing voters and strengthening the impact of the Latin-American community in the political sphere. It has held meetings in 2006 and 2007 in Los Angeles and advocates issues such as immigration reform including the legalization of undocumented immigrants.

References

Hispanic and Latino American organizations
Political advocacy groups in the United States